The 2000 Intercontinental Final was the twenty-second running of the Intercontinental Final and was the second last qualifying stage for Motorcycle speedway riders to qualify for the 2001 Speedway Grand Prix series. The Final was run on 12 August at the Holsted Speedway Center in Holsted, Denmark.

Intercontinental Final
 12 August
  Holsted, Holsted Speedway Center
 First place to 2001 Speedway Grand Prix
 Riders 2-7 plus 1 reserve to GP Challenge

References

2000
World Individual